Viana is a comarca in the Galician Province of Ourense. The overall population of this local region was 5,682 in 2019.

Municipalities
A Gudiña, A Mezquita, Viana do Bolo and Vilariño de Conso.

References

Comarcas of the Province of Ourense